African-American man, Jordan Jameson was lynched on November 11, 1919, in the town square of Magnolia, Columbia County, Arkansas. A large white mob seized Jameson after he allegedly shot the local sheriff. They tied him to a stake and burned him alive.

Background
Arkansans were on edge after the deadly Elaine massacre (September 30–October 1, 1919) in rural Elaine, Arkansas. During the riots, hundreds of black people were killed and according to the Encyclopedia of Arkansas, "the Elaine Massacre was by far the deadliest racial confrontation in Arkansas history and possibly the bloodiest racial conflict in the history of the United States."

On November 7, 1919, Columbia County Sheriff Benjamin E. Greer, was heading to the Jordan Jameson house along with deputies Duke Emerson and John Althin. While at the house an altercation broke out which escalated to a shoot out where Greer was shot in the head. In the confusion, Jameson escaped into the forest.

Lynching

As word spread that Greer had been killed a white mob quickly formed and started to patrol the area on the lookout for Jameson. At 1:00 AM on November 11, 1919, a posse of ten men: J. T. Bussey, Will Moody, Otha Dickson, Charles Dickson, Charley White, J. A. Sands, Monroe Henry, Ernest Kimball, W. M. Owen, and Will Toland found Jameson and his wife in a house. He was coaxed outside with a promise that the men wouldn't hurt his wife.

After Greer had been killed Governor Charles Hillman Brough appointed Dave Futch as the new sheriff of Magnolia. He tried to bring the situation under control and arrest Jameson but the mob refused to listen or listen to the local law enforcement. On November 11, 1919, at around 5:00 a.m., Jameson was taken to the public square of the city of Magnolia and tied to a stake. Flammable material was stacked around him and in front of a growing crowd of people, it was lit on fire slowly burning Jameson alive. His body was eventually turned over to the black community.

Aftermath
These race riots were one of several incidents of civil unrest that began in the so-called American Red Summer of 1919. Terrorist attacks on black communities and white oppression in over three dozen cities and counties. In most cases, white mobs attacked African American neighborhoods. In some cases, black community groups resisted the attacks, especially in Chicago and Washington DC. Most deaths occurred in rural areas during events like the Elaine Race Riot in Arkansas, where an estimated 100 to 240 black people and 5 white people were killed. Also in 1919 were the Chicago Race Riot and Washington D.C. race riot which killed 38 and 39 people respectively. Both had many more non-fatal injuries and extensive property damage reaching into the millions of dollars.

See also
Elaine massacre (September 30–October 1, 1919) in rural Phillips County, Arkansas
African American veterans lynched after WWI

Bibliography 
Notes

References
 

 - Total pages: 368 
  

 
1919 deaths
1919 murders in the United States 
Lynching deaths in Arkansas 
People murdered in Arkansas
1919 riots in the United States
November 1919 events  
Arson in Arkansas 
White American riots in the United States 
History of Arkansas   
1919 in Arkansas
African-American history of Arkansas   
Columbia County, Arkansas 
Racially motivated violence against African Americans
Riots and civil disorder in Arkansas
Red Summer
Deaths from fire in the United States
Magnolia, Arkansas